Yu Rong is a Chinese billionaire who chairs the health services firm Meinian Onehealth. He currently resides in Shanghai, and graduated from China Europe International Business School.

References

Chinese billionaires
Year of birth missing (living people)
Living people
Place of birth missing (living people)